Restrepo is a neighbourhood (barrio) of Bogotá, Colombia. It is a commercial district.

Neighbourhoods of Bogotá